Rhizophora mangle, the red mangrove, is distributed in estuarine ecosystems throughout the tropics. Its viviparous "seeds", in actuality called propagules, become fully mature plants before dropping off the parent tree. These are dispersed by water until eventually embedding in the shallows.

Rhizophora mangle grows on aerial prop roots, which arch above the water level, giving stands of this tree the characteristic "mangrove" appearance. It is a valuable plant in Florida, Louisiana, and Texas coastal ecosystems.  In its native habitat it is threatened by invasive species such as the Brazilian pepper tree (Schinus terebinthifolius).  The red mangrove itself is considered an invasive species in some locations, such as Hawaii, where it forms dense, monospecific thickets. R. mangle thickets, however, provide nesting and hunting habitat for a diverse array of organisms, including fish, birds, and crocodiles.

Distribution and habitat
Red mangroves are found in subtropical and tropical areas in both hemispheres, extending to near 28°N to S latitude. They thrive on coastlines in brackish water and in swampy salt marshes. Because they are well adapted to salt water, they thrive where many other plants fail and create their own ecosystems, the mangals. Red mangroves are often found near white mangroves (Laguncularia racemosa), black mangroves (Avicennia germinans), and buttonwood (Conocarpus erectus) though often more seaward than the other species. Through stabilization of their surroundings, mangroves create a community for other plants and animals (such as  mangrove crabs). Though rooted in soil, mangrove roots are often submerged in water for several hours or on a permanent basis. The roots are usually sunk in a sand or clay base, which allows for some protection from the waves.

Specimens of Moesziomyces aphidis have been collected from water samples and on Rhizophora mangle leaves along the Perequê-Áçu River, in mangroves located in São Paulo State, Brazil.

Description
Red mangroves are easily distinguishable through their unique prop roots system and viviparous seeds. The prop roots of a red mangrove suspend it over the water, thereby giving it extra support and protection. They also help the tree to combat hypoxia by allowing it a direct intake of oxygen through its root structure.

Its bark is thick and a grey-brown color. They are a darker shade of green on the tops than on the bottoms. The tree produces yellow flowers in the spring.

Reproduction
As a viviparous plant, R. mangle creates a propagule that is in reality a living tree. Though resembling an elongated seed pod, the fully grown propagule on the mangrove is capable of rooting and producing a new tree. The trees are hermaphrodites, capable of self or wind pollination. The tree undergoes no dormant stage as a seed, but rather progresses to a live plant before leaving its parent tree. A mangrove propagule may float in brackish water for over a year before rooting.

Gallery

See also

 Wetland

References

External links

Rhizophora mangle images at bioimages.vanderbilt.edu
https://web.archive.org/web/20100114230245/http://www.dpi.qld.gov.au/28_9227.htm More detailed information on the Red Mangrove.

mangle
Mangroves
Pantropical flora
Flora of West Tropical Africa
Flora of Australasia
Flora of South America
Flora of Florida
Flora of Mexico
Plants described in 1753
Taxa named by Carl Linnaeus